Bonnington Square is a square in Vauxhall, south London, which was built in the 1870s. It became famous in the 1980s when all the houses in it, vacant and awaiting demolition, were squatted.

History 

Bonnington Square was constructed in the 1870s in order to house railway workers. By the late 1970s, Bonnington Square was compulsorily purchased by the Greater London Council (GLC) for the Inner London Education Authority (ILEA), which intended to demolish it in order to build a new school. A Turkish shopkeeper in one of the buildings managed to prevent the demolition through legal means during the period in which all the houses' occupants were departing, and shortly afterward squatters began moving into the vacated buildings.

Squatted
In the 1980s, the square was almost completely occupied. The squatters established a volunteer-run vegetarian cafė, a community garden on part of the square that had been bombed during the Second World War, a bar, a nightclub and a wholefoods shop.
The squatters subsequently formed a housing cooperative and successfully negotiated with ILEA for the right to lease the buildings. The café and garden continue into the present.

In November 2021 the café was forcibly closed by Bonnington Centre community association’s (BCCA) management committee.

Recent events

The residents of the square undertook a project in 1990 to change the garden into a "Pleasure Garden" (named in homage to the nearby Vauxhall Pleasure Gardens), and in the process formed the Bonnington Square Garden Association. In 1998, the housing cooperative was permitted by the London Borough of Lambeth to purchase the buildings.

In June 2018, two performances of Twelfth Night by Flute Theatre were held in the gardens in a production directed by actress Kelly Hunter.

See also
Oval Mansions

References

External links 

 Bonnington Square Garden Association
 Bonnington Centre community resource
 The Bonnington Cafė
 "Bonnington Square" on Vimeo, a 20-minute documentary about the history of the square's squatting
 Sustainable squatting in Bonnington Square, a 10-minute documentary on the squats by The Guardian

Squares in the London Borough of Lambeth
Legalized squats
Squats in the United Kingdom
1870s establishments in the United Kingdom